Max Weisel (born November 12, 1991 in Tucson, Arizona) is an American software engineer and digital artist. His experience as an iOS app developer predates the release of Apple's App Store. He's collaborated with avant garde artist Björk, to produce Biophilia, the first full-length app album. In addition his work has been featured in museums such as the New York Museum of Modern Art. He is the founder of the San Francisco-based research and development company RelativeWave, which was acquired by Google in 2014.

Works
MxTube, 2008
Soundrop, 2010
Biophilia, 2011
 Moon
 Dark Matter
 Solstice
Björk: Solstice, 2011 - A Christmas separate app.
Biophilia Tour, 2012 - App Developer, Performer, Musical Director.
RelativeWave, 2012 - Founded a research and development studio in San Francisco.
ARTPOP App, 2013 - An app to accompany the album ARTPOP by Lady Gaga
Form, 2014 - An app prototyping and development tool.

See also 

Björk
Software Engineering
Artificial Intelligence

References

External links
 Personal website
 Facebook
 Wired Magazine Article about Max Weisel
 Soundrop application in New York Museum of Modern Art
 Profile
 Björk 'People' Bio

American digital artists
Interface designers
Living people
1991 births